Greenfield District is a transit-oriented mixed-use development next to a rail station in Mandaluyong, Metro Manila, the Philippines. It is a redevelopment of the old United Laboratories (Unilab) pharmaceutical plant and adjacent retail market in the village of Highway Hills adjoining the Kapitolyo village of Pasig to the east. The  mixed commercial and residential complex is in the crossroads of EDSA and Shaw Boulevard immediately south of the Ortigas Center financial district. It consists of an office tower, condominium high-rises, a central park, retail centers and recreational facilities.

Location
Greenfield District is situated along Metro Manila's main thoroughfare, EDSA, near the geographic center of the metropolis. It is a natural extension of Ortigas Center abutting the Shangri-La Plaza and Edsa Shangri-La, Manila developments, as well as Lourdes School of Mandaluyong, to the north. The district is spread over an area bounded on the north by Shaw Boulevard, on the east by Pioneer Street on the south by Reliance Street, and EDSA on the west. It is in a rapidly urbanizing area of eastern Mandaluyong that saw gentrification in the late 2000s with the construction of Robinsons Cybergate and Forum Robinsons, TV5 Media Center, Avida Towers Centera and the SM Light, SM Fame and SM Flair residential towers by SM Investments. Greenfield District is directly connected to the Manila MRT 3 Shaw Boulevard station through its Edsa Central The Pavilion development. It is also indirectly linked to Shangri-La Plaza and Starmall Edsa Shaw through the walkways of the MRT station.

History

Greenfield District is on a  plot of land acquired by Unilab founder Jose Yao Campos from Ortigas & Company in the 1950s. For a long time, the area belonged to the  Hacienda de Mandaloyon, a former friar estate owned by the Order of Saint Augustine which Francisco Ortigas purchased in the 1920s. The Campos group moved its Unilab production plant from its Santa Mesa compound to the Mandaluyong property in 1961. In the same year, the group formed Greenfield Development Corp. to manage the rest of the property.

Greenfield Development's first foray into the property development industry was with its wet and dry goods market launched in the 1970s. The Edsa Central, popularly known as Edsa Crossing, covered  of a corner of the property facing Edsa and Shaw Boulevard and included a jeepney terminal. After two decades, Greenfield Development announced its complete redevelopment into a modern shopping center to be divided into four separate buildings or sections, namely the Edsa Central Station Mall, Edsa Central Bazaar, Edsa Central Wet Market and Jeepney Park. Along with the makeover of its flagship mall in December 2003, Greenfield Development announced that a masterplan for the property as the new Greenfield District mixed-use development was being drawn up. It launched its first condominium project in the district in January 2004, the Soho Central, in partnership with Jose Antonio's Meridien Development Group.

In March 2007, Unilab announced that it will be transferring all its production facilities in Mandaluyong to its  Pharma Campus in Biñan, Laguna. In November 2009, Greenfield Development broke ground on the second residential development in the district, its first exclusive project, with the twin-tower Twin Oaks Place.

Developments

Greenfield District is home to The Hub, The Portal, The Square and The Pavilion strip malls comprising the Edsa Central development. It also hosts the Greenfield Weekend Market which offers outdoor dining and live jazz music every weekend evening. The market is housed in the Greenfield Central Park that occupies the open space between the four retail buildings. The district's green open spaces comprise 40% of the entire development. The Portal houses a trampoline park, known simply as Trampoline Park, and an indoor rock climbing gym known as Climb Central Manila.

Greenfield Tower
It features a six-level retail podium, a restaurant, garden and auditorium on its roof deck. It was completed in October 2017.

Residential developments

Twin Oaks Place
Twin Oaks Place is a twin tower residential condominium development along Shaw Boulevard consisting of a 43-storey East Tower and a 49-storey West Tower. Its first tower, West Tower, was completed in 2014 while its second tower, East Tower, was topped off in October 2017.

Zitan
Zitan is a 35-storey condominium development by Equus Property Venture, Inc., a wholly owned subsidiary of Greenfield Development. It is located next to The Pavilion development and the MRT station.

References

External links
 Official website of Greenfield Development Corporation

Mixed-use developments in Metro Manila
Buildings and structures in Mandaluyong
Planned communities in the Philippines